David Oxtoby may refer to:

 David W. Oxtoby (born 1951), American chemist and college president
 David Oxtoby (artist) (born 1938), British artist